Erik Mueggler is an American anthropologist, and Professor at the University of Michigan.

Life
He attended Deep Springs College and graduated from Cornell University with a B.A. in socio-cultural anthropology, and Johns Hopkins University with a Ph.D. in anthropology

Awards
 2002 MacArthur Fellows Program
 Center for the Advanced Studies in the Behavioral Sciences Fellowship
 British Academy Fellowship

Works
"Spectral Chains: Remembering the Great Leap Forward Famine in a Yi Community", Re-envisioning the Chinese revolution: the politics and poetics of collective memories in reform China, Editors Ching Kwan Lee, Guobin Yang, Stanford University Press, 2007, 
"Dancing Fools: Politics of Culture and Place in a 'Traditional Nationality Festival.' Modern China 28(1).   2002.
The Age of Wild Ghosts. Memory, Violence, and Place in Southwest China, Berkeley: University of California Press. 2001, 
"Spectral Subversions: Rival Tactics of Time and Agency in China." Comparative Studies in Society and History 41(3): 458-481. 1999.
"The Poetics of Grief and the Price of Hemp in Southwest China." Journal of Asian Studies 57(4): 979-1008. 1998.

References

The Paper Road: Archive and Experience in the Botanical Exploration of West China and Tibet (University of California Press, 2011)

External links
"Other Chinas: The Yao and the Politics of National Belonging" (review), Anthropological Quarterly - Volume 75, Number 1, Winter 2002, pp. 221–224
"Book Reviews", Anthropologica, 2003
Interview with Mueggler on "New Books in East Asian Studies"

American anthropologists
Cornell University alumni
Johns Hopkins University alumni
University of Michigan faculty
MacArthur Fellows
Deep Springs College alumni
Year of birth missing (living people)
Living people
East Asian studies scholars